Pelican Island is an island located in Galveston County, Texas. It is part of the city of Galveston and is linked to Galveston Island by the Pelican Island causeway. The island is home to the Texas A&M University at Galveston as well as two museum ships—the destroyer escort  and the submarine —and Seawolf Park. Seawolf Parkway is the only street that runs across the island.

In 1965, Galveston businessman George Mitchell purchased a large parcel of land on Pelican Island and donated some of it for the permanent home of Texas A&M University at Galveston. The Intracoastal Waterway borders it to the north, separating Pelican Island from another island.

References

Islands of Galveston County, Texas
Galveston, Texas